Al Hadbaa University College is a private Iraqi university established in 1994 in Mosul, Iraq.

History 
Alhadbaa was established in 1994; this university is one of the oldest private universities in Iraq and the first private university in Mosul.

this university was affected by the Isis war in Mosul as the public Mosul university, in 2014 after getting rid of the terrorists this university resumed its better education; as "All The Way Up For The Knowledge"....

The university is accredited by the ministry of higher education in Iraq.

Departments  
 Pharmacy
 Computer Technology Engineering
 Business Administration 
 Law 
 Accounting
 Dentistry 
 English literature (translating)
 Satisfactory analyzes 
 Medical Laboratory Techniques Department

External links 
 https://www.facebook.com/Alhadbaauniversity/
 http://alhadba-university.net/
 http://hcumosul.edu.iq/

Hadbaa
Educational institutions established in 1994
1994 establishments in Iraq